René Soller (born 31 May 1974) is a retired Swiss football defender.

References

1974 births
Living people
Swiss men's footballers
FC St. Gallen players
FC Gossau players
FC Wil players
Association football defenders
Swiss Super League players